Amygdaloid Island is an island in Lake Superior off the northeastern shore of Isle Royale.  It is within the boundary of Isle Royale National Park, a national park located within the U.S. state of Michigan.  The island is protected and patrolled by a seasonal ranger station operated by the U.S. National Park Service.

Geography
Amygdaloid Island is approximately 3.8 miles (6 km) long but no more than 0.25 miles (0.4 km) wide.  Like the rest of the Isle Royale archipelago, the island is an ancient ridge of basalt oriented from the southwest to the northeast.

Amygdaloid Island is separated by Amygdaloid Channel from Isle Royale.  It had relatively low visitation until the 1990s, when the growth of sea kayaking made it possible for human-powered visitors to approach the island.  The waters of Lake Superior around Amygdaloid Island are notoriously dangerous, and inexperienced kayakers are not encouraged to navigate them.

Geology
The island is the site of the Amygdaloid Island Flow, a deposit of basaltic lava with silica inclusions.  After the lava cooled, the inclusions hardened into pink agate specimens.  The agates of Amygdaloid Island are characteristically almond-shaped or amygdaloidal, hence the name Amygdaloid.

See also
List of islands in Isle Royale National Park

References

Isle Royale National Park
Uninhabited islands of Michigan
Protected areas of Keweenaw County, Michigan
Islands of Keweenaw County, Michigan